Isla bonita is a 2015 Spanish drama film directed, co-written, and starred by Fernando Colomo. Its cast also features Olivia Delcán, Nuria Román, Miguel Ángel Furones, Lilian Caro, Tim Bettermann, and Lluís Marqués.

Plot 
Miguel Ángel invites his friend Fer (a run down publicist) to Menorca to spend some time there. Once in the island, Fer acquaints with sculptor Nuria and her daughter Olivia, who is caught in between her current boyfriend and her ex, a local man.

Cast

Production 
The screenplay was penned by Colomo together with Olivia Delcán and Miguel Ángel Furones. The film is a Comba Films and La Perifèrica Produccions production, and it had the support of the Illes Balears Film Commission. It was fully shot on location in the island of Menorca. It features dialogue in Spanish, English, and Menorquin, the Catalan dialect pertaining to the island.

Release 
The film world premiered  out of competition in the 'Zabaltegi' section of the 63rd San Sebastián International Film Festival on 21 September 2015. Distributed by Surtsey Films, it was theatrically released in Spain on 6 November 2015.

Reception 
Pere Vall of Fotogramas rated Isla bonita 4 out of 5 stars, highlighting its pleasant freshness and the play of Delcán and her boyfriends, also pointing out that the film, while flirting with Woody Allen and François Truffaut, still feel very much Colomo's.

Andrea G. Bermejo of Cinemanía rated the "minimal" yet "authentic and fresh" production 3½ stars, highlighting Colomo's onscreen comicity in his own film, in between "Moretti and Woody Allen", and "more of a loser than Louis C.K.", as the film's standout.

Jordi Batlle Caminal of La Vanguardia deemed the film to be "balsamic, refreshing and airy, as well as spontaneous".

Rene Rodriguez of Miami Herald rated the film 3 out of 5 stars, observing that the non-professional cast of actors and their improvised dialogues bestow the comedy with "an uncommon intimacy and freshness", with an observational brand of humor.

Accolades 

|-
| rowspan = "2" align = "center" | 2016 || 30th Goya Awards || Best New Actor || Fernando Colomo ||  || 
|-
| 60th Sant Jordi Awards || colspan = "2" | Best Spanish Film ||  || 
|}

See also 
 List of Spanish films of 2015

References 

2015 drama films
2010s Spanish-language films
2010s Spanish films
Films set in the Balearic Islands
Films shot in the Balearic Islands
Films directed by Fernando Colomo